The Queensland Highlanders Pipe Band is a grade one pipe band based in Brisbane, Queensland, Australia.

The band's Pipe Major is Jason Palfrey; lead drummer is Stuart Palfrey.

The band was formed in 1996 by Fraser Martin and a small group of dedicated musicians keen to build an exciting pipe band from the ground up. Despite the relatively short history of the band, it has enjoyed a high level of success in both competitive and entertainment endeavours.

The band competed in the World Pipe Band Championships in 2000 where it was placed 5th in Grade 2. In 2001, they competed in the championships again and won in the Grade 2 category. They were the first civilian pipe band from Australia to win this title.

The band won the Australian Pipe Band Championships in Grade 1 in 2004.

References

External links
Official website

Grade 1 pipe bands
Pipe bands